The Kreis Rheinwald forms, together with the Kreise of Avers, Domleschg, Schams and Thusis the Hinterrhein District of the Canton of Graubünden in Switzerland.  The seat of the sub-district office is in Splügen.

Municipalities 
The Kreis ("sub-district") is composed of the following municipalities:

External links 

 
 Information Platform Kreis Rheinwald

Districts of Graubünden